The men's discus throw at the 2021 World Athletics U20 Championships was held at the Kasarani Stadium on 21 and 22 August.

Records

Results

Qualification
The qualification took place on 21 August, in two groups, with Group A starting at 10:46 and Group B starting at 11:35. Athletes attaining a mark of at least 58.00 metres ( Q ) or at least the 12 best performers ( q ) qualified for the final.

Final
The final was held on 22 August at 16:00.

References

Discus throw
Discus throw at the World Athletics U20 Championships